Kathrin Langschwager (born 18 December 1966) is a German volleyball player. She competed in the women's tournament at the 1988 Summer Olympics.

References

1966 births
Living people
German women's volleyball players
Olympic volleyball players of East Germany
Volleyball players at the 1988 Summer Olympics
Sportspeople from Rostock